Phyllonorycter ilicifoliella is a moth of the family Gracillariidae. It is found from the Czech Republic to Portugal, Sicily and Greece and from France to Romania.

The larvae feed on Quercus cerris. They mine the leaves of their host plant. They create a lower-surface tentiform mine with many sharp folds in the lowers epidermis. Usually, the roof of the mine is incompletely eaten out, leaving a green centre. Pupation takes place within the mine in a cocoon that lies freely in the mine and is entirely covered with frass.

References

ilicifoliella
Moths of Europe
Moths described in 1843